Sally Maria Diggs  (1851 – ?) was an African-American slave girl, also known as "Pinky," whose freedom was famously bought by Henry Ward Beecher in 1860, during a sermon at Plymouth Church, Brooklyn, NYC.  Beecher famously said, "No child should be in slavery, let alone a child like this’ and raised $900 to purchase her freedom.  The episode was celebrated in a number of paintings and drawings at the time, including Eastman Johnson's "Freedom Ring."

In 1927, "Pinky" returned to Plymouth Church to celebrate the 80th anniversary of Henry Ward Beecher's first sermon at Plymouth Church.

In 2010, "Pinky" was celebrated by sculptor Meredith Bergmann.

References 

1851 births
Year of death missing
19th-century American slaves
People from Charles County, Maryland